The Trofeu Individual Bancaixa 2007 is the 22nd season of the Trofeu Individual Bancaixa, the one-on-one trophy of Escala i corda, a variant of Valencian pilota.

Pilotaris

Since Previous round 
 Colau of La Pobla de Vallbona
 Pedro of València
 Soro III of Massamagrell
 Víctor of València

Since Quarter finals 
 Álvaro of Faura
 Genovés II of Genovés
 Grau of València
 León of Genovés
 Miguel of Petrer
 Núñez of València

Feridors 
 Miguelín of València, for Álvaro.
 Oltra of Genovés, for Genovés II.
 Pedrito of València, for Miguel.
 Tino of València, for Grau.

Matches

Previous round

Notes 
 The winner of the match Soro III and Víctor plays against Álvaro.
 The winner of the match Pedro and Colau  plays against Grau.

Eliminatories

Final

Notes 
 Unlike previous seasons, the 2007 Individual matches' first score is 15-15 jocs.
 In order to prevent mistrusts, the relevant pilotaris have a fixed feridor playing only for them.
 Quarter finals: The match Grau versus Colau is delayed from 3 June to 6th due to a slight illness of Grau.
 Quarts de final: The match Álvaro versus Víctor is not played because of a serious illness of Víctor.

External links 
 Official webpage
 Premiere
 Tagarinet's webpage
 Final match chronicle

Valencian pilota competitions
Valencian pilota professional leagues